LC Brühl Handball is a women's handball club from St. Gallen in Switzerland. LC Brühl Handball competes in the Spar Premium League.

Kits

Sports Hall information

Name: – Sportanlage Kreuzbleiche
City: – St. Gallen
Capacity: – 4200
Address: – 	Bogenstrasse 10. 9000 St. Gallen, Switzerland

Titles 

 Spar Premium League
 Winners (31) : 1970, 1971, 1972, 1973, 1974, 1975, 1976, 1977, 1978, 1979, 1980, 1987, 1988, 1989, 1990, 1991, 1992, 1993, 1994, 1995, 1996, 1997, 2002, 2003, 2007, 2008, 2009, 2011, 2012, 2017, 2019

 Switzerland Handball Cup
 Winners (10) : 2002, 2003, 2004, 2006, 2008, 2009, 2010, 2012, 2016, 2017

 Swiss SuperCup
 Winners (1): 2021

European record

Team

Current squad 
Squad for the 2022–23 season

Goalkeepers
 12  Fabia Schlachter
 16  Sladana Dokovic
Wingers
RW
 15  Fabienne Tomasini
 44  Matea Baric
LW 
 21  Stéphanie Lüscher
 24  Dimitra Hess
Line players 
 7  Martina Pavić
 9  Mirjam Ackermann
 17  Tabea Schmid

Back players
LB
 3  Mathilde Schæfer
 4  Mia Kernatsch
 19  Yara Mosimann
 25  Angela Zürni
 77  Katarina Simova
CB 
 4  Mia Kernatsch
 14  Laurentia Wolff
 22  Kinga Gutkowska
RB
 10  Malin Altherr

External links

References

Swiss handball clubs
Sport in St. Gallen (city)